Elemér Kiss (born 1944) is a Hungarian jurist who served as spokesman of the Hungarian government from 7 November 1995 to 6 July 1998.

References
 dunatv.hu

1944 births
Living people
Government spokespersons of Hungary